The Nelson House on Davis Street in Lake Providence, Louisiana was a historic mansion listed on the National Register of Historic Places on October 3, 1980.

It was a Queen Anne-style house with a large and prominent turret, as is typical for large Queen Anne style houses elsewhere but which is somewhat rare in Louisiana, where so-called Queen Anne houses are often modest one- or two-story I-houses with some Queen Anne details.  It has an L-shaped plan.  It has two semi-octagonal bays in addition to the corner turret, and it has a Colonial Revival-style curving gallery.

A garage to the rear of the house was added in the 1940s.

It was listed along with several other Lake Providence properties and districts that were studied together in the Lake Providence MRA on October 3, 1980.

The house is no more standing. It has disappeared some time between 1980 and 1996.

See also
National Register of Historic Places listings in East Carroll Parish, Louisiana
Lake Providence Commercial Historic District
Lake Providence Residential Historic District
Arlington Plantation
Fischer House

Old Courthouse Square

References

Notes

Houses on the National Register of Historic Places in Louisiana
Queen Anne architecture in Louisiana
Houses completed in 1905
East Carroll Parish, Louisiana
1905 establishments in Louisiana